The Walls We Bounce Off Of is a bluegrass album by American musician John Hartford, released in 1994 (see 1994 in music).

Reception

Music critic Brian Beatty, writing for Allmusic, wrote of the album "Whatever this relaxed album lacks in comparison to the studio polish of his early RCA recordings or the reverence for older traditions that characterized his Rounder releases, there's no refuting that Hartford's love of music and joy for life permeate these seriously silly songs."

Track listing
All songs by John Hartford.
 "More Big Bull Fiddle Fun" – 3:43
 "The Queen of Rock & Roll"  – 2:20
 "Can't Stand to Throw Anything Away" – 3:39
 "Interstate Waltz" – 2:30
 "Flea Market Breakdown" – 2:59
 "Your Tax Dollars at Work" – 2:00
 "When the Dinner Bell Rings" – 1:32
 "I Just Wanna Look in There" – 4:52
 "The All Collision All Explosion Song" – 2:06
 "Fourteen Pole Cat Skins on a Chevy Camaro" – 2:45
 "Sexual " – 2:39
 "Wonder Woman" – 2:21
 "Hooter Thunkit" – 3:18

Personnel
 John Hartford – vocals, banjo, fiddle, guitar, percussion

References

John Hartford albums
1994 albums